Steptoe and Son is a 1972 British comedy drama film and a spin-off from the popular British television comedy series of the same name about father-and-son rag-and-bone dealers. It starred Wilfrid Brambell and Harry H. Corbett as the eponymous characters, Albert and Harold Steptoe respectively, and features Carolyn Seymour. A sequel, Steptoe and Son Ride Again, was released the following year.

Plot
During a stag do at a local football club, Harold meets one of the acts, a stripper called Zita. After a whirlwind romance, the couple are married, although the actual wedding ceremony is delayed when Albert, acting as best man, loses the ring somewhere in the yard. They eventually find it in a pile of horse manure, and since they have no time to clean up, the smell of the manure on their clothes has noses twitching in church.

Harold and Zita fly to Spain for their honeymoon, but Albert refuses to be left behind. His constant presence begins to drive a wedge between Harold and Zita. When they are finally alone and begin to consummate their marriage, they are interrupted by Albert's cries of distress from the adjoining room, and discover that he has contracted food poisoning from some of the local cuisine.

The only available flight back home at short notice has only two seats, and Harold feels obliged to fly home with Albert, leaving Zita in Spain to follow as soon as possible. Back home, Albert quickly recovers, while Harold frets over Zita not writing. When he finally receives delayed postcards and a letter from her, she tells him she has decided their marriage cannot work and has taken up with a British holiday rep at the hotel where they were staying. Harold is heartbroken, and, despite his earlier scheming to get rid of Zita, Albert is sympathetic.

Some months later, Harold tracks down Zita and finds that she is pregnant, and when he assumes he is the father she does not disabuse him. Harold offers to take care of them both and persuades Zita to go with him, but on returning home Albert makes it clear that he does not like her and she flees. A short while later, the two men find a baby in the horse's stable. Harold assumes that the child is Zita's, and, with Albert's help, takes on its rearing. They argue over what name to give the baby, with Albert insisting he have his name, and Harold eventually compromises by naming him Albert Jeremy at the christening but always refers to him as Jeremy.

Returning from work one day, Harold finds the baby has been taken from his pram while Albert was asleep. An unsigned note left in the pram convinces Harold it is from Zita wanting the child back. Searching for her, Harold comes across her stripping in a local rugby club where she is grabbed by some men in the audience. Attempting to save her, Harold is beaten up and is only rescued when Zita and her musician save him by taking him into her dressing room. Harold hears a baby's cries but, when he pulls back a curtain, he finds a mixed-race baby. It turns out that Zita and her musician, who is black, are a couple. Harold then realises that 'Jeremy' was not Zita's baby and was not his child.

Cast
 Wilfrid Brambell as Albert Steptoe
 Harry H. Corbett as Harold Steptoe
 Carolyn Seymour as Zita Steptoe
 Arthur Howard as Vicar
 Victor Maddern as Chauffeur
 Fred Griffiths as Barman
 Joan Heath as Zita's mother
 Fred McNaughton as Zita's father
 Lon Satton as Pianist
 Patrick Fyffe as Arthur (as Perri St. Claire)
 Patsy Smart as Mrs Hobbs
 Mike Reid as Compere
 Alec Mango as Hotel Doctor
 Michael Da Costa as Hotel Manager
 Enys Box as Traffic Warden
 Barrie Ingham as Terry

Production
The film had investment from the Robert Stigwood Organisation.

Reception
The film was a success at the box office and made a profit of five times its cost.

References

External links
 

1972 films
1972 comedy-drama films
Adultery in films
British comedy-drama films
Films about dysfunctional families
Films based on television series
Films directed by Cliff Owen
Films scored by Roy Budd
Films scored by Ron Grainer
Films set in London
Films set in Spain
Films shot in London
British pregnancy films
Steptoe and Son
Films about striptease
EMI Films films
1972 comedy films
1972 drama films
1970s English-language films
1970s British films